Robert John Clift (born 1 August 1962) is a former field hockey player.

He was a member of the Great Britain squad in the 1988 Summer Olympics in Seoul where they won a gold medal. His preferred position was inside left. He also won silver with the England squad at the 1986 Hockey World Cup.

Clift was born in Newport, Wales, and was educated at Bablake School and the University of Nottingham. He has played club hockey for Nottingham Hockey Club, Southgate Hockey Club and East Grinstead Hockey Club.

References

External links
 
 

English male field hockey players
English Olympic medallists
Olympic field hockey players of Great Britain
British male field hockey players
Olympic gold medallists for Great Britain
Field hockey players at the 1988 Summer Olympics
Field hockey players at the 1992 Summer Olympics
1962 births
Living people
People educated at Bablake School
Sportspeople from Newport, Wales
Olympic medalists in field hockey
Medalists at the 1988 Summer Olympics
East Grinstead Hockey Club players
Southgate Hockey Club players
1990 Men's Hockey World Cup players